Hugh Glanffrwd "Jimmy" James AFC & Bar, DFM (3 October 1922 – 7 January 2015) was a Welsh aviator and Royal Air Force (RAF) officer, who rose to the rank of squadron leader. 

His plane, a Bristol Bombay of No. 216 Squadron RAF (a slow transport plane flying a usually "safe" route), was shot down on 7 August 1942 while carrying Lieutenant-General William Gott to meet Churchill. The death of Gott led to Lieutenant-General Bernard Montgomery becoming the new commander of the Eighth Army and leading them in the Second Battle of El Alamein.

References

1922 births
2015 deaths
Royal Air Force pilots of World War II
Recipients of the Air Force Cross (United Kingdom)
Recipients of the Distinguished Flying Medal
Royal Air Force squadron leaders
Welsh aviators
Shot-down aviators
Welsh military personnel